Tynan is a village, townland (of 375 acres) and civil parish in County Armagh, Northern Ireland.

Tynan had a population of 71 people (35 households) in the 2011 Census. (2001 Census: 71 people)

History 

Tynan won the status as the most well-preserved rural Irish village in 1993.

The Troubles
On January 21, 1981, Sir Norman Stronge, 8th Baronet (86), Ulster Unionist Party member, and former Speaker at Stormont, and his son, James Stronge (48), an off-duty member of the Royal Ulster Constabulary reserve, were shot dead by the Provisional Irish Republican Army (IRA) at their mansion, Tynan Abbey, Tynan.

Places of interest 
Tynan Abbey has an extensive demesne, a country house belonging to the Stronge family was situated here until it was destroyed by the Provisional IRA in 1981. The ruins have since been demolished. The grounds hold an extensive cemetery with grave stones going back centuries and others worn beyond recognition.

Tynan has a High cross in the village's church yard, dating from 700 to 900. It shows a carving of Adam and Eve under an apple tree.

Transport

The Ulster Railway opened the station on 25 May 1858 as Tynan, Caledon & Midleton. In 1876 the Ulster Railway merged with other railways to become the Great Northern Railway (Ireland).

Tynan was formerly served by mainline trains of the Great Northern Railway (Ireland) and was also the eastern terminus of the narrow gauge Clogher Valley Railway. Tynan railway station on the Clogher Valley railway opened on 2 May 1887 and shut 1 January 1942. Tynan and Caledon railway station on the mainline opened on 25 May 1858 and shut on 1 October 1957.

People
Sgt. Samuel Lindsay BEM (1928-1990). Tynan RUC Station Sergeant 1952–1988. Awarded the British Empire medal in 1983 for counter-terrorism work in Armagh and beyond.
Peter McManus, recipient of the Victoria Cross.
The antiquarian William Reeves was the Church of Ireland Rector of Tynan in the 1860s.

Civil parish of Tynan
The civil parish contains the villages of Killylea, Middletown and Tynan.

See also
List of civil parishes of County Armagh

References 

Lewis 1842 - Tynan
Armagh villages

External links 

Villages in County Armagh
Townlands of County Armagh
 
Armagh City and District Council